The gens Saltia was an obscure plebeian family at ancient Rome.  Hardly any members of this gens are mentioned in history, but others are known from inscriptions.

Origin
The nomen Saltius might be derived from the Latin saltare, to dance.  The nomen Saltorius was derived from the related saltor, a dancer.  Alternatively, Saltius might be derived from saltus, a glade or ravine.

Members
 Sextus Saltius, together with Lucius Considius, one of the commissioners appointed to establish a colony at Capua in 83 BC.  Cicero described their conduct as arrogant, and ridiculed them for their errors.
 Publius Saltius Mysticus, probably a freedman, was a friend of Lucius Aelius Macer, one of the Seviri Augustales at Patavium in Venetia and Histria.
 Saltia Euthycia, probably a freedwoman, one of the friends of Lucius Aelius Macer, named in his funerary inscription.
 Gaius Saltius Victor, a soldier in the third legion, stationed at Lambaesis in Numidia in AD 173.

See also
 List of Roman gentes

References

Bibliography
 Marcus Tullius Cicero, De Lege Agraria contra Rullum.
 Dictionary of Greek and Roman Biography and Mythology, William Smith, ed., Little, Brown and Company, Boston (1849).
 Theodor Mommsen et alii, Corpus Inscriptionum Latinarum (The Body of Latin Inscriptions, abbreviated CIL), Berlin-Brandenburgische Akademie der Wissenschaften (1853–present).
 George Davis Chase, "The Origin of Roman Praenomina", in Harvard Studies in Classical Philology, vol. VIII, pp. 103–184 (1897).
 John C. Traupman, The New College Latin & English Dictionary, Bantam Books, New York (1995).

Roman gentes